Summerson is a surname. Notable people with the surname include:

Hugo Summerson (born 1950), British politician
John Summerson (1904–1992), English architectural historian

See also
Mount Summerson, mountain surmounting the northern end of Endurance Cliffs in the Geologists Range of Antarctica